Wiesław Gębala (born 14 September 1950) is a Polish cross-country skier. He competed in the men's 15 kilometre event at the 1976 Winter Olympics.

References

External links
 

1950 births
Living people
Polish male cross-country skiers
Olympic cross-country skiers of Poland
Cross-country skiers at the 1976 Winter Olympics
Sportspeople from Bielsko-Biała